is a Japanese ski mountaineer.

Yokoyama finished third at the 2007 Asian Championship of Ski Mountaineering and won Bronze.

References

External links 
 Minehiro Yokoyama at SkiMountaineering.org
 Yokojama Minehhiro at Ameblo 

1971 births
Living people
Japanese male ski mountaineers